Lovelace Watkins (March 6, 1933– June 11, 1995) was an American, Las Vegas-based singer and performer (also nicknamed "The Black Sinatra"), who achieved prominence in America as well as in Europe and Australia.

Biography 
Watkins was born in New Brunswick, New Jersey, in 1933. He was of African, Indian and Spanish heritage. His mother gave birth to him at fourteen years old, and he was raised by his grandmother.

He studied microbiology at Rutgers University, and also trained as a boxer. His operatically trained and signature booming voice took him to Europe where he was invited to entertain at the Royal Command Performance for the Queen of the United Kingdom. The Times called him “the best entertainer on earth.” In South Africa, he received two gold albums, and a public parade was held in his honor which was unprecedented for a black entertainer at the height of apartheid. He appeared on The Ed Sullivan Show in 1961 while promoting his album, "The Big, Big Voice of Lovelace Watkins", music arranged and conducted by Ray Ellis. In addition to appearing on The Ed Sullivan Show, Lovelace also appeared on the Johnny Carson and Mike Douglas shows.

With poor management decisions and a Hollywood screen test that never transpired, Lovelace never reached his full potential in the United States.

Lovelace became popular in northern England, and the Liverpool public helped make his debut at their Wookey Hollow's night club an overnight sensation, and he was recalled for a second show one week later.  He performed at the London Palladium on 15th November 1971 in front of Her Majesty the Queen.

His third Wookey Hollow cabaret appearance was recorded and televised on BBC1 at 11.35pm on 8 May 1974.  Following this, Lovelace Watkins at one time held the attendance record at the "Talk Of The Town" in London, England, at the height of its prominence, and attended by such stars as Roger Moore and Australia's Barry Crocker, who went on to become a great friend of Lovelace. Watkins did a "Command Performance" for Queen Elizabeth II, and appeared on the British religious variety series "Stars on Sunday".  After his last reappearance at the Wookey Hollow when he introduced his new blonde wife, Lovelace disappeared into obscurity as far as his UK fan base was concerned. In 1974, Lovelace did a ten week long summer season at The ABC Theatre in Blackpool. The shows were sold out.

Australia
Watkins had a long association with Australia's Gold Coast. He helped raise money for the city following the devastating floods in 1974. He was named "Ambassador at large" by Gold Coast Mayor, Keith Hunt. Watkins recorded two songs that beat more than 250 entries to be selected. They were "We Love The Gold Coast" by Clyde Collins, and "On The Gold Coast" by Tom Louch from Victoria. The single was released on the Finooks Folly label.

South Africa

In apartheid South Africa, Watkins was the guest of honor at a woman's banquet. He was pictured in The Sunday Express dancing with a white woman, which wasn't good for the hotel where it was taken as it nearly lost its license.

Personal life and death 
In March 1972, he married Anna Marie Fitzsimmons of Salford, Lancashire, and their baby son was born in 1972; the marriage later ended.  Nearing the end of his music career, Watkins started a successful company that prepared apartments and commercial buildings for rental companies in the Las Vegas area, and continued singing at various functions in Las Vegas. He died of leukemia in 1995.

Releases

Notes

External links
 
 

1933 births
1995 deaths
Sue Records artists
20th-century American singers
20th-century American male singers